The 45th edition of the annual Clásico RCN was held from October 2 to October 9, 2005 in Colombia. The stage race started in Cúcuta and finished with an individual time trial in Manizales. RCN stands for "Radio Cadena Nacional" – one of the oldest and largest radio networks in the nation.

Stages

2005-10-02: Cúcuta – Cúcuta (120.4 km)

2005-10-03: Bucaramanga – El Socorro (121.8 km)

2005-10-04: El Socorro – Tunja (162 km)

2005-10-05: Duitama ("Circuito Mundialista 1995") (142.4 km)

2005-10-06: Tunja – Bogotá (198.2 km)

2005-10-07: Soacha – Ibagué (190 km)

2005-10-08: Ibagué – Armenia (105.2 km)

2005-10-09: Chinchiná – Manizales (26.4 km)

Final classification

Teams 

05 Orbitel

Lotería de Boyacá-Coordinadora

Aguardiente Antioqueño-Lotería de Medellín

Postal Express

Coordinadora - Monarca - Sabaneta

Envía-Indeportes Boyacá

Frugos de Cali

Gobernación de Norte de Santander-Bono del Ciclismo

Club Cicloases Cundinamarca

Frutidelicias Frugos

Mixto 1

Mixto 2

Mixto 3

Coordinadora-Lotería de Boyacá

See also 
 2005 Vuelta a Colombia

References 
 Clásico RCN 2004

Clásico RCN
Clasico RCN
Clasico RCN